Arakkonam is a railway town and suburb of Chennai within Chennai Metropolitan Area limit, in the Indian state of Tamil Nadu, with a population of 78,395 per the census 2011. In October 2022 Arakkonam is a part of Chennai Metropolitan Area.

Arakkonam is one of the hottest towns in India, where the temperature can exceed 43 °C (110 °F) for several peak days in summer. The name 'Arakkonam' was derived from the word "Arunthamizhkundram" also later called "Aarukonam", meaning 'hexagon' which connects six important places around.

History 
The ancient name of the town was "Arumthamizh kundram" ("Arumtamil kunram") which is believed to have been derived from the Tamil words aaru konam meaning "six angles" or hexagon, based on the fact that six important places exist on the town's six sides, namely Kanchipuram, Thakkolam, Manavur, Thiruvalangadu, Thiruttani and Sholinghur.

Arakkonam Junction is one of the oldest junctions in the country connecting with major cities such as Bangalore, Mumbai, Goa, Vijayawada, Hyderabad, Coimbatore, Tirupati, Mangalore, Kochi and Thiruvananthapuram.

Municipality 
The Arakkonam Municipality was constituted as a 3rd Grade Municipality on 1 October 1958 and upgraded to a 2nd Grade Municipality on 1 May 1974 and has been a 1st Grade Municipality from 17 April 1984. Arakkonam is a part of the assembly and parliamentary constituencies of the same name. This municipality contains 36 wards.

Urban infrastructure 
Arakkonam Junction railway station is one of the largest railway junction in Tamil Nadu. It strategically located at the intersection of the Chennai–Bangalore line, Arakkonam–Chengalpattu branch line and the Guntakal–Chennai line, which is part of Mumbai–Chennai line. The town has one of the biggest workshops for Southern Railway, known as the 'Engineering Workshop' (EWS) which has many employees serving the Indian Railways in various process related with fabrication and processing of various metal components for the railways. Most of the machines in these workshops are a century old and some of them are working. It also has an electric locomotive shed, 'Electric Loco Shed' (ELS). WAG-5 HA, WAP-4 and WAG-9 locomotives are maintained here. Suburban electric train facility is also available towards Chennai. Arakkonam junction is also feature in a song "Vellarikka" of movie Kadhal Kottai starring Ajith Kumar and Devayani.

The second-biggest Food Corporation of India (FCI) godown is located at Arakkonam in Tamil Nadu. It is used to store all types of food grains for a long periods. Transport is also available by road to all major cities and towns.

The runway at INS Rajali, a naval air force of the Indian Navy in Arakkonam is 4,500 metres in length, making it the second-longest air force runway in the Indian Subcontinent. It is also Asia's second-biggest Naval Training Centre.

Other industries include MRF Tyres, Ramco Industries and UltraTech Cement.

Many official buildings in Arakkonam were built during the British era. An underpass beneath the railway connects Arakkonam and Kanchipuram and is one of the city's oldest structures. It was built with lime mortar and stones.

Demographics 

According to 2011 census, Arakonam had a population of 78,395 with a sex-ratio of 1,020 females for every 1,000 males, much above the national average of 929. A total of 7,727 were under the age of six, constituting 3,995 males and 3,732 females. Scheduled Castes and Scheduled Tribes accounted for 27.1% and 1.11% of the population respectively. The average literacy of the town was 81.81%, compared to the national average of 72.99%. The town had a total of  19507 households. There were a total of 26,029 workers, comprising 80 cultivators, 206 main agricultural labourers, 674 in house hold industries, 21,857 other workers, 3,212 marginal workers, 42 marginal cultivators, 33 marginal agricultural labourers, 156 marginal workers in household industries and 2,981 other marginal workers. As per the religious census of 2011, Arakonam had 81.22% Hindus, 9.83% Muslims, 7.95% Christians, 0.04% Sikhs, 0.03% Buddhists, 0.35% Jains, 0.58% following other religions and 0.01% following no religion or did not indicate any religious preference.

Politics 
Arakkonam (State Assembly Constituency) is part of the Arakkonam (Lok Sabha constituency). The AIDMK candidate Mr.S.Ravi, Advocate won the Arakkonam assembly constituency in the 2016 elections. In the parliamentary elections held in 2009, the DMK candidate Shri S. Jagathrakshakan was elected MP from this constituency. In the 2014 Lok Sabha election, L. Hari Krishnan of AIADMK wrested the seat from the DMK with a margin of over 2,40,000 votes. He polled 493534 votes while the DMK candidate N.R. Elango polled just 252768 votes. Mr. S. Kannadasan of AIADMK won the post of municipality chairman in the 2014 by-election. In the 2019 General elections, Dr. S. Jakathrakshagan from Dravid Munnetra Kazhagam (DMK) won against AIADMK Front (from PMK) candidate A.K. Moorthy.

References 

Cities and towns in Ranipet district
Suburbs of Chennai